In computability theory, a truth-table reduction is a reduction from one set of natural numbers to another.
As a "tool", it is weaker than Turing reduction, since not every Turing reduction between sets can be performed by a truth-table reduction, but every truth-table reduction can be performed by a Turing reduction. For the same reason it is said to be a stronger reducibility than Turing reducibility, because it implies Turing reducibility. A weak truth-table reduction is a related type of reduction which is so named because it weakens the constraints placed on a truth-table reduction, and provides a weaker equivalence classification; as such, a "weak truth-table reduction" can actually be more powerful than a truth-table reduction as a "tool", and perform a reduction which is not performable by truth table.

A Turing reduction from a set B to a set A computes the membership of a single element in B by asking questions about the membership of various elements in A during the computation; it may adaptively determine which questions it asks based upon answers to previous questions. In contrast, a truth-table reduction or a weak truth-table reduction must present all of its (finitely many) oracle queries at the same time. In a truth-table reduction, the reduction also gives a boolean function (a truth table) which, when given the answers to the queries, will produce the final answer of the reduction. In a weak truth-table reduction, the reduction uses the oracle answers as a basis for further computation which may depend on the given answers but may not ask further questions of the oracle.

Equivalently, a weak truth-table reduction is a Turing reduction for which the use of the reduction is bounded by a computable function. For this reason, they are sometimes referred to as bounded Turing (bT) reductions rather than as weak truth-table (wtt) reductions.

Properties 

As every truth-table reduction is a Turing reduction, if A is truth-table reducible to B (A ≤tt B), then A is also Turing reducible to B (A ≤T B). Considering also one-one reducibility, many-one reducibility and weak truth-table reducibility,
 ,
or in other words, one-one reducibility implies many-one reducibility, which implies truth-table reducibility, which in turn implies weak truth-table reducibility, which in turn implies Turing reducibility.

The forward direction is trivial and for the reverse direction suppose  is a total computable functional. To build the truth-table for computing A(n) simply search for a number m such that for all binary strings  of length m  converges. Such an m must exist by Kőnig's lemma since  must be total on all paths through . The forward direction fails for weak truth-table reducibility.

References 

 H. Rogers, Jr., 1967. The Theory of Recursive Functions and Effective Computability, second edition 1987, MIT Press.  (paperback), 

Reduction (complexity)